Sumner v. Shuman, (1987), was a case in which the Supreme Court of the United States held that a mandatory death penalty for a prison inmate who is convicted of murder while serving a life sentence without possibility of parole is unconstitutional.

See also 
 List of United States Supreme Court decisions on capital punishment

References

United States Supreme Court cases
1987 in United States case law